Kasar may refer to:
 Qasar, a brother of Genghis Khan
 Kaşar, a type of cheese
 Kasar, Çine, a village in Turkey
 Jarek Kasar (born 1983), Estonian singer
 Karin Kasar, member of the German music band Real McCoy
 Kudret Kasar (1914–2003), Turkish equestrian
 Kasar Devi, village in Almora, Uttarakhand, India
 Kasar Amboli, village in Pune, Maharashtra, India
 Kasar Vadavali, neighborhood of Thane, Maharashtra, India
 Kasar Block, sub-division in Sheikhpura, Bihar, India including Karimabigha
 Mohammad Ajmal Amir Kasar or Ajmal Kasab, Pakistani militant, member of Lashkar-e-Taiba

See also 
 
 Kassar, an Arabic surname
 Casar (disambiguation)